Jasaur Kheri is a large village located, near Jhajjar city in Jhajjar District of Indian state of Haryana. Every year villagers organise a big 'Jagrata' on the eve of Ashtami in Navaratras, followed by Bhandara in morning. On side of temple there is Harshringi lake, Whose water is considered very holy and used for bathing gods and goddesses in temple. Harshringi devi mandir is named after Harshringi('Har' means Shri Krishan and 'Shringi' is the name of a famous saint). There is a hospital and water treatment plant established by Government of Haryana to cater health needs of people. Village also has its own stadium and akhara, where boys work on their physique and improve wrestling skills. In past, village used to be known as village of wrestlers. Most of the people living here, work in government departments located in Delhi. Village is developing on good pace. It might possible it become the well known place of Haryana in future. 

Majority of people in this village is Jat of Tehlan (in Jasaur) and Deswal (in Kheri) Gotra.

Pradeep Deswal, a well known student leader in Haryana is also from this village. Pradeep holds a PhD in Law from MDU, Rohtak and has also contested the 2019 Lok Sabha elections.

Atomic Research Centre
This is the 6th Research and Development unit under the aegis of Department of atomic Energy. In future this centre will get direct connectivity to New Delhi Airport and will play pivotal role in Atomic Energy Research and Development.

Expressways 
The Kundli-Manesar-Palwal 6 lane expressway passes through Jasaur Kheri village. KMP Expressway is also known as Western Peripheral Expressway. The starting point of Delhi–Amritsar–Katra Expressway is also Jasaur Kheri village.

Banks in Jasaur Kheri 
Punjab National Bank
Sarv Haryana Gramin Bank
 Poor People Helping Group:Not Registered 
Member Strength: 150

Connectivity 
Nearest Railway Station is Asauda.
Limited State Transport is available for Bahadurgarh and Sonepat.

See also 
Bahadurgarh
Rohtak
Kundli
Jhajjar

References 

Villages in Jhajjar district